Bound is a 1996 American neo-noir crime thriller film written and directed by the Wachowskis in their feature film directorial debut. Violet (Jennifer Tilly), who longs to escape her relationship with her mafioso boyfriend Caesar (Joe Pantoliano), enters into a clandestine affair with alluring ex-con Corky (Gina Gershon), and the two women hatch a scheme to steal $2 million of Mafia money.

Bound was the first film directed by the Wachowskis, and they took inspiration from Billy Wilder to tell a noir story filled with sex and violence. Financed by Dino De Laurentiis, the film was made on a tight budget with the help of frugal crew members including cinematographer Bill Pope. The directors initially struggled to cast the lesbian characters of Violet and Corky before securing Tilly and Gershon. To choreograph the sex scenes, the directors employed sex educator Susie Bright as an ad hoc intimacy coordinator, and she also made a cameo appearance in the film.

Bound received positive reviews from film critics who praised the humor and style of the directors as well as the realistic portrayal of a lesbian relationship in a mainstream film. Detractors of the film found its plot superficial and criticized the violence as excessive. The film won several festival awards.

Plot

Corky, a lesbian ex-con, is hired as a painter and plumber at an apartment building. She encounters Violet and Caesar, the couple who live next-door to the apartment she is renovating. While Caesar is gone, Violet deliberately drops an earring down the sink; the building owner sends Corky to retrieve it. Violet admits to purposely dropping the earring and starts to seduce Corky. They are interrupted by Caesar's arrival and Corky returns to work. When she leaves for the day, Violet follows her to her truck, and they have sex in Corky's apartment. The next morning, Violet tells Corky that Caesar is a money launderer for the Mafia and they have been together for five years.

Later, Violet overhears Caesar and his mob associates beating and torturing Shelly, a man who has been skimming money from the business. Upset by the violence, Violet confides to Corky that she wants to make a new life for herself, but that she needs her help. Knowing that Caesar will bring the nearly $2 million that Shelly embezzled back to the apartment, the two women hatch a scheme to steal the money. After Mafia boss Gino Marzzone's son Johnnie shoots and kills Shelly, Caesar returns to the apartment with a bag of bloody money. Angry at Johnnie for furiously killing Shelly and splattering blood everywhere, Caesar proceeds to wash, iron and hang the money to dry.

Violet explains to Corky that Caesar and Johnnie hate each other, and that Gino and Johnnie will be coming to pick up the money from Caesar. Corky devises a plan: when Caesar has finished counting the money, he will shower to unwind. While he does, Violet will purposely drop a bottle of Glenlivet scotch that Gino prefers and tell Caesar that she is going to buy more. As she leaves the apartment, Corky will enter, steal the money from a briefcase, and leave. Violet will then return with the scotch and tell Caesar that she just saw Johnnie leave. Suspicious, Caesar will check the briefcase, find the money gone, and assume Johnnie has taken it. Corky and Violet think Caesar will be forced to flee because Gino will assume he has been robbed by Caesar, not Johnnie.

When Caesar finds the money gone, he realizes Gino will think he stole it if he runs and decides to retrieve the money from Johnnie. Panicking, Violet threatens to leave, but Caesar forces her to stay, suspecting she and Johnnie may have stolen the money and framed him. Corky waits next-door with the money while Gino and Johnnie arrive. After Johnnie flirts with Violet and taunts him, Caesar pulls out a gun and tells Gino that his son stole the money. He kills Gino, Johnnie and Roy, Gino's bodyguard. Caesar tells Violet that they must find the money, dispose of the bodies, and pretend Gino and Johnnie never arrived lest their mob pals discover their absence. Unable to find the money at Johnnie's apartment, Caesar telephones Mickey, a mob buddy, telling him that Gino has yet to arrive.

After discovering Corky and Violet stole the money, Caesar ties them up, threatens to torture them, and demands to know where it is. When Mickey arrives at the apartment, Caesar makes a deal with Violet to help him stall. Violet calls their landline from Johnnie's cell phone and convinces Caesar to feign a conversation with Gino explaining that he and Johnnie are in the hospital after a car accident. The ruse fools Mickey, who leaves for the hospital. Corky tells Caesar she has hidden the money in the next-door apartment and he goes to retrieve it. Violet escapes and calls Mickey, telling him that Caesar stole the money and forced her to keep quiet. Corky tries to stop Caesar from taking the money, but he assaults her. Violet arrives and holds Caesar at gunpoint; she informs him Mickey is coming and that he should run while he can. When Caesar refuses, Violet kills him.

Later, Mickey, who believes Violet's story, tells her that he will find Caesar. Mickey wants Violet to be his girlfriend, but she tells him that she needs a clean break—which she makes by driving off hand-in-hand with Corky.

Cast
 Gina Gershon as Corky
 Jennifer Tilly as Violet
 Joe Pantoliano as Caesar
 Mary Mara as Bartender
 Susie Bright as Jesse
 Margaret Smith as Woman Cop
 Barry Kivel as Sheldon 'Shelly'
 Christopher Meloni as Johnnie Marzzone
 John Ryan as Mickey Malnato
 Peter Spellos as Lou
 Ivan Kane as Cop #1
 Kevin M. Richardson as Cop #2
 Richard C. Sarafian as Gino Marzzone
 Gene Borkan as Roy

Background and production

Conception
Film producer Joel Silver has said that after working as scriptwriters on Assassins, the Wachowskis made Bound as an "audition piece" to prove that they knew what to do on a movie set. Conversely, Lana Wachowski has said Joel "made that up."  The Wachowskis themselves claim they "decided simply to focus on making their own directorial debut."  They had the idea to write a story about how one might see a woman on the street and make assumptions about her sexuality, but how those assumptions might be wrong. They wanted to play with stereotypes and make an entertaining film that contained sex and violence, because those are the kinds of films that they like to watch. Seeing film noir as a genre within which they could tell a contained story and twist conventions, they described Billy Wilder as a big influence.

When executives at some studios read the script, they told the Wachowskis that if they changed the character of Corky to that of a man, they would be interested. The siblings declined, saying "that movie's been made a million times, so we're really not interested in it." Dino De Laurentiis, the executive producer on Assassins, offered to finance Bound and his company produced it, giving them "free rein" with regard to the story. The film's budget was $6 million.

Casting
The Wachowskis struggled to cast the roles of Violet and Corky, seemingly because of the lesbian content of the film. Few actresses were interested. The part of Violet was expected to go to Linda Hamilton, and Jennifer Tilly read for the part of Corky. She loved the role and was looking forward to playing a character very different from previous parts in her career. When the part of Violet became available, and Gina Gershon came in to read for Corky, Tilly agreed that Gershon would make a better Corky. She realized that she identified with the character of Violet, a woman "underestimated by all the men around her" who has to "play the game". She describes it as the best role she had ever had. Gina Gershon suggested Joe Pantoliano to the Wachowskis for the part of Caesar. It was his first lead role in a film, and he describes it as his favorite.

Filming
Bound was filmed over a thirty-eight day period, in Santa Monica, California. The Wachowskis' original director of photography resigned, claiming that he could not film with the limited budget available, nor did he know anyone else who would be willing to work so cheaply. Subsequently, cinematographer Bill Pope was hired, who knew "a bunch of cheap guys" who would be willing to work within the budget. Pope was heavily involved in creating the visual noir style of the film. He and the Wachowskis drew inspiration from their love of comics and were particularly influenced by Frank Miller's neo-noir Sin City series. Pope's sound counterpart was sound director Dane Davis. In the scene where Corky and Violet plan the theft, he chose to give Corky a cat-like quality, by supplying a "swishing" sound each time she walked past the camera.

The Wachowskis asked Joe Pantoliano to watch John Huston's The Treasure of the Sierra Madre and to focus on Humphrey Bogart's character in order to portray Caesar's  paranoia. Gershon's role was influenced by James Dean, Marlon Brando and Clint Eastwood. Both Gershon and Tilly were nervous about the sex scenes, and prepared for filming by drinking tequila.

Very little improvisation took place during the filming due to the directors' extensive planning and clear vision for the film. Despite their planning, the physical exchanges in the script caused some injuries. Barry Kivel was injured, when his head was banged against a toilet, in the scene where Shelly was violently beaten in Caesar's bathroom. Gina Gershon was also injured. In a scene between Corky and Caesar, near the end of the film, Gershon struck a gun from Joe Pantoliano's hand so violently, that she required stitches.

Sex scenes
The sex scenes were choreographed by feminist writer and sex educator Susie Bright. The Wachowskis were fans of Bright and sent her a copy of the script with a letter asking her to be an extra in the film. Bright loved the script, particularly as it was about women unapologetically having and enjoying sex. Disappointed by the lack of description in the sex scenes, she offered to be a sex consultant for the film, and they accepted. The main sex scene, set in Corky's apartment, was filmed in one long shot. The Wachowskis believed that the continuous shot would be more realistic than several shots edited together. Although it was intended to be a closed set, there were actually many people present, moving the walls of the set in order to allow full movement of the camera around the actors.

Bright appeared as Jesse, the woman Corky tries to talk to in the bar. Comedian Margaret Smith played Jesse's girlfriend and the extras in the bar scene were Bright's friends—"real life San Francisco dykes".

Themes
The Wachowskis describe several themes present in Bound. They say that the film is about "the boxes people make of their lives", that it is not only gay people who "live in closets". They wanted to define all of Bound characters by the "sort of trap that they were making out of their lives". Violet is trapped in her life with Caesar, and in the first scene, Corky is literally inside Violet's closet, bound and gagged by Caesar. This scene is echoed later in the film when Violet says "I had this image of you inside of me..." This theme of being trapped is exacerbated by the claustrophobic feeling created by the fact that most of the film takes place in Violet and Casear's apartment, or the apartment next door where Corky is working.

Susie Bright described some of the specifically lesbian themes of the film. One is the concept of the hand as a sex organ, highlighted by lingering camera shots of Corky and Violet's hands. Another is the repeated use of water as a symbolic motif to represent women, present for example when Corky is retrieving Violet's earring from the sink. Bright describes it as a movie that is "wet" (feminine) as opposed to "hard" (masculine). She says the scene where Corky and Violet have their first conversation is full of "lesbian signs". She highlights the fact that Violet, away from Caesar, is wearing jeans and able to be less overtly feminine. Jennifer Tilly says that whenever Violet is talking to men, her voice becomes high-pitched and "girly"—making her seem vulnerable and ensuring she is taken care of. Joe Pantoliano agrees, saying that the result is that "everyone in the film wants to be with Violet". When she is with Corky, Violet can drop the act and talk at a more natural pitch. According to Bright, the more subtle lesbian themes of the film were noticed and appreciated at the LGBT film festival screenings.

Release

Rating
Bound was rated by the Motion Picture Association of America (MPAA) as R for "strong sexuality, violence and language." To achieve that rating, the directors had to cut part of the first sex scene between Corky and Violet. The MPAA were most concerned with the images of what Lana Wachowski called "hand-sex". It was rated R in Australia, R18 in New Zealand and 18 in the United Kingdom. In Canada it was rated as R in Manitoba and Ontario, 18 in Nova Scotia and 16+ in Quebec.

Distribution
The film premiered on August 31, 1996, at the Venice Film Festival and in September went on to play at the Toronto International Film Festival. It opened in U.S. theaters on October 4, 1996, distributed by Gramercy Pictures, showing in 261 theaters. It closed after three weeks. It opened in the United Kingdom on February 28, 1997.

Box office
Bound grossed $3,802,260 in the United States and $3,209,057 from other territories, for a worldwide total of $7,011,317. In its opening weekend, showing at 261 theaters, it earned $900,902, which was 23.7% of its total gross. According to Box Office Mojo, it ranked at 161 for all films released in the United States in 1996, and at 74 for R-rated films released that year. , its all-time ranking for LGBT-related films is 59.

Critical response
The review aggregation website Rotten Tomatoes gave it a positive rating of 89% based on 53 reviews, with a weighted average of 7.9/10. The site's consensus reads: "Bounds more titillating elements attracted attention, but it's the stylish direction, solid performances, and entertaining neo-noir caper plot that make it worth a watch". Metacritic gave it a score of 61/100 based on 19 reviews. The Wachowskis' direction was praised, being described as clever, sophisticated and stylish. Roger Ebert said that their skillful film making showed virtuosity and confidence. Marjorie Baumgarten writing for The Austin Chronicle called it an impressive debut saying that the Wachowskis have "style to burn". James Kendrick called it a darkly comical and stunning film, saying it signalled the arrival of the Wachowskis on the film scene. Detractors of the film included Todd McCarthy for Variety, who said that the directors had no sense of humor and lacked depth, that the film was pretentious, superficial and heavy-handed.

On the release of Bound, the Wachowskis were compared by many to the Coen Brothers. Rita Kempley for The Washington Post went so far as to call them "Coen Brothers clones". In particular, similarities were drawn between Bound and the Coen Brothers' first film, 1984 neo-noir Blood Simple. Bryant Frazer for Deep Focus called it an "obvious precursor". Critics noted resemblances to the films of Quentin Tarantino and Alfred Hitchcock.

Janet Maslin for The New York Times said that the grisly violence in Bound would likely limit its audience and Ebert said that its shocking violence would offend some audiences. Some critics said that the violent behavior of the characters had no moral justification. Rita Kempley for The Washington Post called it "well-nigh unwatchable cruelty for its own sake". McCarthy, who called the central relationship between the two women unbelievable and unsympathetic, said "just because Violet and Corky fall for each other doesn't mean they somehow fall into a privileged state of grace in which vile behavior can be forgiven." Other critics were less concerned, calling the violence "comically excessive" and "Tarantino-like".

Bound was praised for being perhaps the first mainstream film to have a lesbian relationship at its heart without homosexuality being central to the plot. Despite the presence of "unapologetically gay" lead character Corky, it is not commonly considered a "lesbian movie". Emanuel Levy said that this is a weakness, that mainstream films with broadening storylines "do not necessarily represent a positive development in the making of gay and lesbian films" and that Bound has "little, if anything, to do with lesbian cinema". Jonathan Rosenbaum for the Chicago Reader called it a "welcome change" to have a lesbian couple as the main characters in a mainstream film. Sarah Warn for AfterEllen.com called Corky "the closest thing to a realistic and sympathetic butch lesbian we've seen in a mainstream movie". Barry Walters for the San Francisco Chronicle praised the film for showing gay characters that have an active sex life. The sex scenes, described as explicit and steamy, were admired for being tasteful, discreet and realistic. Warn called them "some of the best lesbian sex scenes to date in a mainstream movie".

The three lead actors were complimented for their performances. Ebert said that Gershon and Tilly were electric together, and Frazer said that he would have liked to have seen more of their love story. Some critics described their onscreen relationship as unbelievable and unsympathetic. Gershon was seen to have made a comeback after her role in the less well received 1995 film Showgirls. Tilly's performance was compared to her Academy Award-nominated part in Bullets Over Broadway. Pantoliano was described as "a lot of fun" and having the "trickiest scenes in the movie".

Accolades
Bound won the Grand Jury Award—Honorable Mention at the 1996 L.A. Outfest, and in the same year won an Honorable Mention at the Stockholm International Film Festival. At the 1997 Fantasporto festival in Portugal, the Wachowskis were awarded the International Fantasy Film Award for best film, and Jennifer Tilly picked up the award for best actress. Bound won the 1997 GLAAD Media Award for Outstanding (wide-release) Film. The film was nominated for the prestigious Grand Prix of the Belgian Syndicate of Cinema Critics.

Home media
Bound was released on Region 1 DVD on November 12, 1997, by Republic Pictures. It featured the original theatrical trailer and an audio commentary by the directors and stars. It was released on Region 2 DVD on August 25, 2003, by Pathé featuring original theatrical trailers, audio commentary by the directors and stars, cast and crew biographies and a production featurette. Its Region 4 DVD release, distributed by Reel and featuring an audio commentary, came on August 14, 2006.

Music
The score, composed by Don Davis, was given a promotional release on November 25, 1997, by Super Tracks Music Group, but has never been released commercially. Having her character Corky play a jaw harp was Gina Gershon's idea. The directors' budget for songs was small; they had wanted to use "The Girl from Ipanema" and Frank Sinatra songs, but could not afford to. The four songs used in the film were not included on the score release.

 "I Never Loved a Man (The Way I Love You)" (Ronny Shannon) performed by Aretha Franklin
 "Hallelujah I Love Her So" (Ray Charles) performed by Ray Charles
 "Hopeless Faith" performed by The Hail Marys
 "She's a Lady" (Paul Anka) performed by Tom Jones

Legacy
The film is often referenced in the Child's Play series. In Seed of Chucky, Tilly plays both the character Tiffany Valentine and a fictionalized version of herself (the latter of which is later possessed by Tiffany), and makes several jokes about being recognized from the film. in 2022, Jennifer Tilly, Gina Gershon, and Joe Pantoliano reunited for an episode of the Chucky TV series playing fictionalized versions of themselves.

See also
 List of LGBT films directed by women

Notes

References

External links

 
 
 
 

1996 films
1996 crime thriller films
1990s erotic thriller films
1990s heist films
1990s feminist films
1996 independent films
1996 LGBT-related films
1990s romantic thriller films
American crime thriller films
American heist films
American independent films
American LGBT-related films
American romantic thriller films
Female bisexuality in film
1990s English-language films
American erotic thriller films
Films scored by Don Davis (composer)
Films about murderers
Films about organized crime in the United States
Films directed by The Wachowskis
Films set in apartment buildings
Films shot in Los Angeles County, California
Lesbian-related films
LGBT-related romantic thriller films
American neo-noir films
Films with screenplays by The Wachowskis
Summit Entertainment films
Gramercy Pictures films
Nudity in film
Spelling Films films
1996 directorial debut films
1990s American films